Morada (Sl. No.: 34) is a Vidhan Sabha constituency of Mayurbhanj district, Odisha.

Area of this constituency includes Morada block, Rasagobindapur block and Suliapada block.

In 2009 election Biju Janata Dal candidate Praveen Chandra Bhanjdeo, defeated Jharkhand Mukti Morcha Bimal Lochan Das by a margin of 6,201 votes.

Elected Members

3 elections held during 1951 to 2009. List of members elected from Morada Vidhan Sabha constituency are:
2019: (34): Rajkishore Das (BJD)
2014: (34): Praveen Chandra Bhanjdeo (BJD)
2009: (34): Praveen Chandra Bhanjdeo (BJD)
1961: (140): Sakila Soren (Praja Swatantra Party)
1951: (50): Prasanna Kumar Das (Socialist)

2019 Election results

2014 Election results

Summary of results of the 2009 Election

Notes

References

Politics of Mayurbhanj district
Assembly constituencies of Odisha